Newport is a city and county borough in Wales, situated on the River Usk close to its confluence with the Severn Estuary,  northeast of Cardiff. With a population of 145,700 at the 2011 census, Newport is the third-largest authority with city status in Wales, and seventh most populous overall. Newport became a unitary authority in 1996 and forms part of the Cardiff-Newport metropolitan area. Newport was the site of the last large-scale armed insurrection in Great Britain, the Newport Rising of 1839. 
The population grew considerably during the 2021 census, rising to 159,587, the largest growth of a unitary authority in Wales.

Newport has been a port since medieval times when the first Newport Castle was built by the Normans. The town outgrew the earlier Roman town of Caerleon, immediately upstream and now part of the borough. Newport gained its first charter in 1314. It grew significantly in the 19th century when its port became the focus of coal exports from the eastern South Wales Valleys. Newport was the largest coal exporter in Wales until the rise of Cardiff in the mid-1800s.

In the 20th century, the docks declined in importance, but Newport remained an important centre for manufacturing and engineering. Latterly its economy is bolstered as part of the M4 corridor high-technology cluster. It was granted city status in 2002. Newport hosted the Ryder Cup in 2010 and was the venue for the 2014 NATO summit. It contains extensive rural areas surrounding the built-up core. Its villages are of considerable archaeological importance. Newport Cathedral is the cathedral of the Diocese of Monmouth.

Etymology
The original Welsh name for the city was Casnewydd-ar-Wysg (pronounced ). This is a contraction of the name Castell Newydd ar Wysg, which translates as "new castle on the Usk". The Welsh name is recorded in the Brut y Tywysogion when it was visited by Henry II of England sometime around 1172. "New castle" suggests a pre-existing fortification in the vicinity and is most likely either to reference the ancient fort on Stow Hill, or a fort that occupied the site of the present castle.

The English name 'Newport' is a later application. The settlement was first recorded by the Normans as novo burgus in 1126. This Latin name refers to the new borough (or town) established with the Norman castle. The origin of the name Newport and the reason for its wide adoption remains the subject of debate. Newport-on-Usk is found on some early maps, and the name was in popular usage well before the development of Newport Docks. One theory suggests that Newport gained favour with medieval maritime traders on the Usk, as it differentiated the "New port" from the "Old Roman port" at Caerleon.

History

Early history

Bronze Age fishermen settled around the fertile estuary of the River Usk and later the Celtic Silures built hillforts overlooking it. In AD 75, on the very edge of their empire, the Roman legions built a Roman fort at Caerleon to defend the river crossing. According to legend, in the late 5th century Saint Gwynllyw (Woolos), the patron saint of Newport and King of Gwynllwg founded the church which would become Newport Cathedral. The church was certainly in existence by the 9th century and today has become the seat of the Bishop of Monmouth. In 1049/50, a fleet of Orkney Vikings, under Welsh king Gruffydd ap Llywelyn, sailed up the Usk and sacked St Gwynllyw's church. The church suffered a similar fate in 1063, when Harold Godwinson attacked south Wales. The Normans arrived from around 1088–1093 to build the first Newport Castle and river crossing downstream from Caerleon and the first Norman Lord of Newport was Robert Fitzhamon.

The original Newport Castle was a small motte-and-bailey castle in the park opposite Newport Cathedral. It was buried in rubble excavated from the Hillfield railway tunnels that were dug under Stow Hill in the 1840s and no part of it is currently visible.

Norman invasion and early modern Newport

Around the settlement, the new town grew to become Newport, obtaining its first charter in 1314 and was granted a second one, by Hugh Stafford, 2nd Earl of Stafford in 1385. In the 14th century friars came to Newport where they built an isolation hospital for infectious diseases. After its closure the hospital lived on in the place name "Spitty Fields" (a corruption of ysbyty, the Welsh for hospital). "Austin Friars" also remains a street name in the city.

During the Last War for Welsh Independence in 1402 Rhys Gethin, General for Owain Glyndŵr, forcibly took Newport Castle together with those at Cardiff, Llandaff, Abergavenny, Caerphilly, Caerleon and Usk. During the raid the town of Newport was badly burned and Saint Woolos church destroyed.

A third charter, establishing the right of the town to run its own market and commerce came from Humphrey Stafford, 1st Duke of Buckingham in 1426. By 1521, Newport was described as having "....a good haven coming into it, well occupied with small crays [merchant ships] where a very great ship may resort and have good harbour." Trade was thriving with the nearby ports of Bristol and Bridgwater and industries included leather tanning, soap making and starch making. The town's craftsmen included bakers, butchers, brewers, carpenters and blacksmiths. A further charter was granted by James I in 1623.

During the English Civil War in 1648 Oliver Cromwell's troops camped overnight on Christchurch Hill overlooking the town before their attack on the castle the next day. A cannonball dug up from a garden in nearby Summerhill Avenue, dating from this time, now rests in Newport Museum.

Industrial Revolution

As the Industrial Revolution transformed Britain in the 19th century, the South Wales Valleys became key suppliers of coal from the South Wales Coalfield, and iron. These were transported down local rivers and the new canals to ports such as Newport, and Newport Docks grew rapidly as a result. Newport became one of the largest towns in Wales and the focus for the new industrial eastern valleys of South Wales. By 1830 Newport was Wales' leading coal port, and until the 1850s it was larger than Cardiff.

The Newport Rising in 1839 was the last large-scale armed rebellion against authority in mainland Britain. John Frost and 3,000 other Chartists marched on the Westgate Hotel at the centre of the town. The march was met with an attack by militia, called to the town by the Mayor, Thomas Phillips: at least 20 marchers were killed and were later buried in Saint Woolos churchyard. John Frost was sentenced to death for treason, but this was later commuted to transportation to Australia. He returned to Britain (but not to Newport) later in his life. John Frost Square (1977), in the centre of the city, is named in his honour.

Newport probably had a Welsh-speaking majority until the 1830s, but with a large influx of migrants from England and Ireland over the following decades, the town and the rest of Monmouthshire came to be seen as "un-Welsh", a view compounded by ambiguity about the status of Monmouthshire. In the 19th century, the St George Society of Newport (a group largely consisting of English settlers and businessmen) asserted that the town was part of England. It was at a meeting in Newport, attended by future Prime Minister David Lloyd George, that the Cymru Fydd movement received its death-blow in 1896 when politician Robert Bird stated: "You will find, from Swansea to Newport, a cosmopolitan population who will not submit to the domination of Welsh ideas!". In 1922 Lloyd George was to suffer a further blow in Newport, when the South Wales Liberal Federation, led by David Alfred Thomas, an industrialist and Liberal politician, and Robert Bird moved that Lloyd George "be not heard" in the 1895 General Election. The Conservative capture of the recently created Newport constituency in a by-election in 1922 was one of the causes of the fall of his coalition government.

The late 19th and early 20th century period was a boom time for Newport. The Alexandra Docks opened in 1875. The population was expanding rapidly and the town became a county borough in 1891. In 1892 the Alexandra South Dock was opened and was the largest masonry dock in the world. Although coal exports from Newport were by now modest compared to the Port of Cardiff (which included Cardiff, Penarth and Barry), Newport was the place where the Miners' Federation of Great Britain was founded in 1889, and international trade was sufficiently large for 8 consuls and 14 vice-consuls to be based in the town. In 1898 Lysaght's Orb Works opened and by 1901 employed 3,000 staff. Urban expansion took in Pillgwenlly and Lliswerry to the south; this eventually necessitated a new crossing of the River Usk, which was provided by the Newport Transporter Bridge completed in 1906, described as "Newport's greatest treasure".

Further extensions to the South Dock were opened in 1907 and 1914. The Newport Docks Disaster occurred on 2 July 1909 when, during the construction of the new south lock connecting the South Dock to the Severn Estuary, supporting timbers in an excavation trench collapsed and buried 46 workers. The rescuers included 12-year-old paperboy Thomas 'Toya' Lewis who was small enough to crawl into the collapsed trench. Lewis worked for two hours with hammer and chisel in an attempt to free one of those trapped who was released the next day. Several hundred pounds was later raised through public subscription in gratitude for the boy's efforts, and he was sent on an engineering scholarship to Scotland. Lewis was awarded the Albert Medal for Lifesaving by King Edward VII in December 1909. A Wetherspoons pub in the city centre is named "The Tom Toya Lewis" after the young hero. The building in which the pub is housed was formerly the Newport YMCA, the Foundation Stone for which was laid by Viscount Tredegar, also in 1909.

From 1893 the town was served by the paddle steamers of P & A Campbell Ltd. (the "White Funnel Line"), which was based in Bristol. The company had been originally set up, by the Scottish brothers Alex and Peter Campbell, on the River Clyde, but was re-located to the Severn Estuary. Departing steamers would face south on Davis Wharf, with the Art College to its left and the town bridge behind. The boats gave rise to the name of the short street which led to the quayside – Screwpacket Road. By 1955 steamers had stopped calling at Newport and P&A Campbell went into receivership in 1959. It was taken over by the firm which would become the Townsend Ferry group.

Compared to many Welsh towns, Newport's economy had a broad base, with foundries, engineering works, a cattle market and shops that served much of Monmouthshire. However, the docks were in decline even before the Great Depression, and local unemployment peaked at 34.7% in 1930: high, but not as bad as the levels seen in the mining towns of the South Wales Valleys. Despite the economic conditions, the council re-housed over half the population in the 1920s and 1930s. In 1930 the Town Dock was filled in.

The post-war years saw renewed prosperity, with Saint Woolos Cathedral (now Newport Cathedral) attaining full cathedral status in 1949, the opening of the modern integrated Llanwern steelworks in 1962, and the construction of the Severn Bridge and local sections of the M4 motorway in the late 1960s, making Newport the best-connected place in Wales. Although employment at Llanwern steelworks declined in the 1980s, the town acquired a range of new public sector employers, and a Richard Rogers–designed Inmos microprocessor factory helped to establish Newport as being extant for technology companies.

A flourishing local music scene in the early 1990s led to claims that the town was "a new Seattle".

The county borough of Newport was granted city status in 2002 to mark Queen Elizabeth II's Golden Jubilee. In the same year, an unusually large merchant ship, referred to locally as the Newport Ship, was uncovered and rescued from the west bank of the River Usk during the construction of the Riverfront Arts Centre. The ship has been dated to between 1445 and 1469 and remains the only vessel of its type from this period yet discovered anywhere in the world.

Key dates in Newport's history
: Norman wood motte and bailey castle built on Stow Hill.
1314: First town charter.
1327–1386: Newport Castle built.
1385: Second town charter granted by Hugh Stafford, 2nd Earl of Stafford.
1402: Town was taken by the forces of Owain Glyndŵr, rebel Prince of Wales during the Welsh Revolt: Saint Woolos Cathedral destroyed.
1426: Third town charter granted by Humphrey Stafford, 1st Duke of Buckingham.
1648: Town was taken by the forces of Oliver Cromwell during the English Civil War.
1672: Tredegar House completed.
1796: Opening of the Monmouthshire Canal.
1839: Chartist Newport Rising, Westgate Hotel, Newport led by radical former mayor John Frost.
1842: Newport Town Dock opens – floating dock able to accommodate the largest ships in the world.
1858: Town Dock extended to the north.
1867: Lower Dock Street drill hall completed.
1871: W. H. Davies, renowned poet born at Portland Street, Pillgwenlly.
1875: Alexandra Dock opens.
1877: Athletic grounds at Rodney Parade opens.
1887: The Boys' Brigade movement in Wales founded by George Philip Reynolds at Havelock Street Presbyterian Church.
1891: Newport gains County Borough status, governed independently of Monmouthshire.
1892: Alexandra South Dock opens, extended 1907 (phase2) and 1914 (phase3).
1880–1900: Godfrey Morgan, 1st Viscount Tredegar donates land for the benefit of the public, including Belle Vue Park, the Royal Gwent Hospital and Newport Athletics Grounds.
1894: Belle Vue Park opens.
1898: Lysaght's Orb Works steelworks opens.

1901: Royal Gwent Hospital moves to its current site
1906: Newport Transporter Bridge opens on 12 September.
1909: Newport Docks Disaster.
1915: First public automatic telephone exchange made in Britain opens in Newport.
1919: George Street/Ruperra Street Race Riots. 
1930: Town Dock closes and filled in.
1937: King George VI visits Newport and cuts first sod of new Civic Centre building.
1949: Saint Woolos pro-Cathedral attains full cathedral status, (now Newport Cathedral).
1962: Llanwern steelworks opens.

1963: Newport rugby club beats the touring New Zealand All Blacks.
2002: Newport granted city status; discovery of the Newport Ship.
2003: Newport Unlimited regeneration company set up.
2010: The Ryder Cup golf competition was hosted at the Celtic Manor Resort.
2013: Hartridge High School reopens as Llanwern High School in a new £29m building.
2014: The 2014 NATO summit takes place at the Celtic Manor Resort.
2015: Friars Walk shopping centre opens.
2019: The International Convention Centre Wales opened at the Celtic Manor Resort.
2019: Railway electrification reached Newport, as part of the 21st-century modernisation of the Great Western main line.

Governance

Newport has long been the largest town in the historic county of Monmouthshire and a county borough between 1891 and 1974. The Local Government Act 1972 removed ambiguity about the legal status of the area by including the administrative county of Monmouthshire and the county borough of Newport into all acts pertaining to Wales. In 1974, the borough was incorporated into the new local government county of Gwent until Newport became a unitary authority again in 1996. Gwent remains in use for ceremonial functions as a preserved county.

Politics
See also :Category:Politics of Newport, Wales
The city is historically industrialised with a large working-class population and strong support for the Labour Party. There is substantial support for the Conservative Party on the west side of Newport, as well as its rural hinterland.

Labour lost control of Newport City council in the 2008 local elections to a Conservative/Liberal Democrat coalition but the Labour Party regained an overall majority of councillors in the 2012 election.

The City of Newport is divided between the UK Parliamentary constituencies of Newport West and Newport East and elects one Member of Parliament (MP) in each constituency. The two constituencies cover a similar area to that of the city area controlled by Newport City Council. The city formerly had only one constituency until 1983 when the city was split into Newport West and Newport East due to population growth. In the 2019 United Kingdom general election, the Labour Party held Newport West with a reduced majority of 902 votes over the Conservative Party and the Labour Party held Newport East with a reduced majority of 1,992 votes over the Conservative Party.

In the Welsh Parliament Newport is divided between the Senedd constituencies of Newport West and Newport East and elects one Member of the Senedd (MS) in each constituency. In the 2021 Senedd election, the Labour Party held Newport West with a reduced majority of 3,926 votes over the Conservative Party and the Labour Party held Newport East with a reduced majority of 3,584 votes over the Conservative Party.

Prior to Brexit, Newport was part of the Wales European Parliament Constituency. The Wales constituency elected four Members of the European Parliament (MEP) on a Proportional representation basis. In the 2019 European Parliament election the Wales constituency elected one MEP from the Labour Party, one from Plaid Cymru and two from the Brexit Party.

Coat of arms

The official blazon of the armorial bearings is: "(arms) Or, a chevron reversed gules, the shield ensigned by a cherub proper. Supporters: on the dexter side a winged sea lion Or, and on the sinister side a sea dragon gules, the nether parts of both proper, finned gold."

Freedom of the City
The title of Freedom of Newport is a ceremonial honour, given by the Newport council to those who have served in some exceptional capacity, or upon any whom Newport wishes to bestow an honour. There have been 17 individuals or organisations that have received the honour since 1909, including:

Rt. Hon. Godfrey Charles Morgan, 1st Viscount Tredegar, Lord Lieutenant of Monmouthshire
Bernard Montgomery, 1st Viscount Montgomery of Alamein (1945)
Corps of the South Wales Borderers (24th Foot)
Royal Regiment of Wales (24th/41st Foot)
104th Regiment Royal Artillery (Volunteers)
Royal Welch Fusiliers (2001)
British Merchant Navy Association
HMS Severn (2006)
Newport County A.F.C. (2013)
Newport R.F.C. (2013)
Royal British Legion (2021)

Geography
It is the largest urban area within the historic county boundaries of Monmouthshire and the preserved county of Gwent. The City of Newport, which includes rural areas as well as the built up area, is the seventh most populous unitary authority in Wales.

The city is largely low-lying, but with a few hilly areas. Areas in the south and east of the city tend to be flat and fertile with some housing estates and industrial areas reclaimed from marshland. Areas near the banks of the River Usk, such as Caerleon, are also low-lying. The eastern outskirts of the city are characterised by the gently rolling hills of the Vale of Usk and Christchurch has panoramic views of the Vale of Usk and the Bristol Channel. Ridgeway at Allt-yr-yn also has good views of the surrounding areas and Bristol Channel. Brynglas has views over the city centre and Twmbarlwm to the west. The suburbs of the city have grown outwards from the inner-city, mostly near the main roads, giving the suburban sprawl of the city an irregular shape. The urban area is continuing to expand rapidly with new housing estates continuing to be built.

The city boundaries include a number of villages in the Newport Built-up area.

Wards and districts
See also :Category:Districts of Newport, Wales
The city is divided into 21 wards. Most of these wards are coterminous with communities (parishes) of the same name. Each community can have an elected council. The following table lists city council wards, communities and associated geographical areas.

* communities with a community council.

Climate

Newport has a moderate temperate climate, with the weather rarely staying the same for more than a few days at a time. The city is one of the sunnier locations in Wales and its sheltered location tends to protect it from extreme weather. Like the whole of the British Isles, Newport benefits from the warming effect of the Gulf Stream. Newport has mild summers and cool winters.

Thunderstorms may occur intermittently at any time of year, but are most common throughout late-spring and summer. Rain falls throughout the year, Atlantic storms give significant rainfall in the autumn, these gradually becoming rarer towards the end of winter. Autumn and summer have often been the wettest seasons in recent times. Snow falls in most winters and sometimes settles on the ground, usually melting within a few days. Newport records few days with gales compared to most of Wales, again due to its sheltered location. Frosts are common from October to May.

On 20 March 1930, the overnight temperature fell to  the coldest temperature for the whole of the UK during that year, and the latest date in spring the UK's lowest temperature has been recorded.

Demography

Religion

In 1929 St Woolos Church became the Pro-Cathedral of the Diocese of Monmouth, becoming a full cathedral in 1949. When Rowan Williams was appointed Archbishop of Wales in 2000, the Cathedral became the Metropolitan Cathedral of Wales.

In 1850 Newport was recognised as a centre of Catholicism in Wales when the Diocese of Newport and Menevia was created. Between 21 October 1966 and 6 October 1969, having retired as Bishop of Rochester, New York, Fulton J. Sheen, an American bishop who pioneered preaching on television and radio, was appointed the titular archbishop of Newport by Pope Paul VI. The Catholic St Patrick's Church is served by the Rosminians.

In the 2011 census 56.8% of Newport residents considered themselves Christian, 4.7% Muslim, 1.2% Other religions (including Hindu, Buddhist, Sikh, Jewish and Others), 29.7% were non-religious and 7.5% chose not to answer the non-compulsory religion question on the census.

Newport has more than 50 churches, 7 mosques, and one synagogue; the nearest Gurudwara is in Cardiff.

The Church in Wales church of St Julius and St Aaron, at St Julian's, was consecrated in 1926.

The following table shows the religious identity of residents residing in Newport according to the 2001, 2011 and the 2021 censuses.

Ethnicity 
In the 2011 census, 89.9% described themselves as White, 5.5% Asian, 1.7% Black, 1.1% Mixed White/Black, 0.5% Mixed White/Asian and 1.4% as other ethnic groups. In the 2021 census, Whites had decreased to 85.6% of the population while all other groups increased bar Black Caribbeans.

Economy

Newport's travel to work area incorporates much of south Monmouthshire; the new 2001-based area also includes Cwmbran. The city itself has three major centres for employment: the city centre, and business parks clustered around the M4 motorway junctions 24 in the east and 28 in the west.

Organisations based in the city include Airbus Defence and Space; the headquarters of the Office for National Statistics; the headquarters of the United Kingdom Intellectual Property Office (formerly known as the Patent Office); the General Insurance Division of Lloyds TSB; a large Panasonic manufacturing plant; a manufacturing plant for International Rectifier; the headquarters of insurance comparison site Gocompare; the headquarters of Wales and West Utilities; the shared-service centre for HM Prison Service; the Passport Office for much of the south and west of the UK; and the Wales headquarters of the Charity Commission and British Red Cross. In 2014 Admiral Insurance opened a large newly constructed office opposite Newport railway station.

In 1997, Newport secured what was then thought to be Europe's largest-ever inward investment when the LG Group announced a £1.7 billion project creating 6,100 jobs, and supported by public sector grants. Facilities were built on the Celtic Lakes business and science park, but market conditions led to the semiconductor plant never opening, and the CRT plant eventually closed in 2003. In 2005 Irish radiator manufacturer Quinn Group bought the former LG Phillips building, which became its European base.

Industry in the east of Newport was formerly based at the Corus Llanwern steelworks, and although the rolling mill is still active, steel manufacture ceased in 2001. Permission has been granted to transform the  former steelworks site into a £1bn mixed-use development comprising housing, office and industrial space, public open space and a range of community facilities.

At the mouth of the River Usk, the Sims Metal Management plant hosts the world's largest industrial shredder for scrap metal with access by road, rail and sea. The plant, which is also the world's largest car crusher which was featured in the TV series 'How do they do it'.

Newport Cattle Market, in the Pillgwenlly area of the city, closed in 2009 and was demolished to make way for a new supermarket.

Regeneration

The city has seen major regeneration projects being undertaken in recent years.

Infrastructure
The first stage of regeneration involved improving the city centre road network, turning Kingsway and Queensway into boulevards. The Southern Distributor Road to the south of the city opened in 2004, including the new City Bridge over the River Usk, improving access and opening up new areas for development. The Newport City footbridge opened in 2006 linking the east and west banks of the river for pedestrians and cyclists.

Newport railway station was expanded in 2007 to four full size platforms capable of receiving 10 car Intercity Express Programme services to and from London Paddington. In 2010 a new station building was finished, carried out by engineering firm Atkins. During construction it was Wales' most environmentally friendly station work, using a hypermodern green ETFE structure similar to the materials used in the Eden Project and the Beijing Olympics' ‘Water Cube’. In 2019 railway electrification and resigning work will be completed, completing the 21st-century modernisation of the Great Western main line and reducing journey times to London to 1 hour 30 minutes.

Newport bus station was redeveloped in 2013, expanded in 2015 with the Friars Walk development, and now offering 24 stands connecting to the rest of the city, as well as Cardiff and Bristol. Local railway stations are reopening, starting with Rogerstone station in 2008, Pye Corner station in 2014, and with three others planned in the city's Unitary Development Plan. Transport for Wales intend to restart services between Newport and Ebbw Vale Parkway by 2021.

A state-of-the-art District General Hospital is envisaged to be built to replace the Royal Gwent Hospital. The former Corus steel Whiteheads site was speculated but this was rejected in favour of redeveloping the Llanfrechfa Grange Hospital site, near Cwmbran as a specialist and critical care unit.

The M4 relief road skirting the southern edge of the urban area of Newport has been proposed as a means of reducing the congestion on the existing M4 motorway (presently squeezed through the Brynglas Tunnels) and making Newport and the surrounding areas more accessible for motorised vehicles. The relief road scheme was cancelled in July 2009 but relaunched in 2014.

Leisure

The Riverfront Arts Centre was the first structure to be built as part of Newport's regeneration by Newport City Council in 2004. It stands on Kingsway Boulevard on the west bank of the River Usk. On the east bank, Rodney Parade is home to club rugby union side Newport RFC, the regional Pro14 rugby union team Dragons, and the football team Newport County A.F.C.

Residential
Newport witnessed the fastest growth in property values in the UK during 2018,

As part of the city's master plan, the city centre has been expanded to take in areas of the River Usk east bank, with the area of land between Newport Bridge and George Street Bridge part of an ongoing a £43 million high-density combined commercial and residential area, joined to the west bank by the new footbridge. The plan is designed to show a strong urban form along the riverfront, emphasised with tall landmark buildings. The first phase has been labelled City Vizion.

The Newport Student Village is adjacent to the university campus on the west bank, as well as the "Newhaus" development of 154 riverside apartments. At the southern end of the site, the "Alexandra Gate" development includes 300 homes and riverside apartments built adjacent to the City Bridge.

In east Newport, land released from the Corus steelworks at Llanwern is being redeveloped as 4,000 houses, shops and other facilities.

Commercial

The Newport retail environment faced challenges following the late-2000s recession, with major redevelopment projects heavily delayed.

Friars Walk shopping complex was first planned as a £210m development ahead of the 2010 Ryder Cup, but faced numerous setbacks. The site opened to the public in November 2015 helped by £90m of assistance from Newport Council to the developers, with the Debenhams flagship store. As well as 30 new shops, there are a dozen restaurants and an eight-screen Cineworld multiplex cinema. Plans for redevelopment of the smaller Cambrian Centre were approved in 2012.

Building on hosting the Ryder Cup in 2010 and the NATO Summit in 2014, the 5,000 capacity Celtic Manor International Conference Centre (ICC Wales) opened its doors in 2019 as a conference venue for businesses and events in Wales and across the South West of England. It has hosted the UK Space Conference, BBC Cymru Wales broadcasts, and numerous national political conferences including hosting the Green Party of England and Wales and the UK Independence Party.

The 15-storey Chartist Tower is currently being redeveloped by developers Garrison Barclay Estates as a 163-bedroom Mercure Hotel, offering views across the city and the Bristol Channel. The site will also include 25,000 sq ft of office space and 18,000 sq ft of retail space. The hotel development is seen as an important step towards meeting the additional demand for hotel space in Newport created by the International Convention Centre (ICC) Wales. The opening of the hotel has been delayed by several months due to Wales' lockdown as a response to COVID-19. It was planned to open it in mid-2021.

Newport Market is also being redeveloped as a £12m mixed use site with a tech hub, apartments, market units, as well as a food court, a project led by Newport City Council and the proprietors of Tramshed Cardiff.

Transport

See also :Category:Transport in Newport, Wales

For those travelling west from England into Wales, Newport is the first major urban area one passes through. As a result, it is a convergence point for national road, bus, and rail routes.

Aviation

The airport is a 35-minute drive away from the city or a 55-minute train journey which involves changing at Cardiff Central for Vale of Glamorgan Line services to the nearby Rhoose Cardiff International Airport railway station. The airport is also accessible by transferring to 24-hour TrawsCymru T9 buses, which begin at Cardiff Central station.

In 2003, a proposal for a new Severnside airport near Newport was rejected by the Department for Transport. The airport would have featured runways on a man-made island in the Severn Estuary.

Buses

Newport bus station is the largest bus interchange in the county, with 24 stands. It was built as part of the adjacent Friars Walk shopping centre and the station opened in December 2015.

Bus services are primarily provided by the municipally funded Newport Bus company, and neighbouring firm Cardiff Bus. Other operators include Phil Anslow Coaches, Stagecoach in South Wales, New Adventure Travel (N.A.T.), and until recently, First West of England.

Inter-city National Express services run from a stop near the Riverfront arts centre, opposite the bus station and Megabus (Europe) services operate outside of Newport station.

Railway 

Newport is the easternmost Welsh city on the United Kingdom rail network and has close proximity to major economic centres in Cardiff and Bristol. Newport railway station is the third-busiest station in Wales and, due to its interchange options, it serves as a major transfer station.

The Great Western main railway line connects the city with termini at Bristol Temple Meads, London Paddington and Pembroke Dock; the Welsh Marches line connects with Holyhead, Manchester Piccadilly and Llanelli; and the Gloucester line connects the borders region including Cheltenham. The Wessex Main Line also provides an hourly service from the city to Portsmouth. The station has four platforms and is a mandatory stop on all express services to and from London Paddington.

The city is well linked with the nearby Welsh capital Cardiff, with approximately six rail and five bus services between the cities every hour. Services to/from Bristol stop at Newport on average 2–3 times per hour, while there are nearly 4 services to/from London each hour.

Modernisation 
Rogerstone railway station, on the Ebbw Valley Railway, reopened in 2008. Services currently run between Ebbw Vale and Cardiff Central via Rogerstone. Transport for Wales services were scheduled to run directly between Newport and Ebbw Vale by 2021.

The current station was built in 2010, in a hypermodern green ETFE structure, after a £22 million refurbishment programme; it introduced the futuristic new passenger terminal and bridge, whilst restoring the 19th-century features of the site. The new complex, west of the old station entrance, includes two terminals, four full-size platforms, new terminal buildings and a public footbridge, a new passenger footbridge, a new taxi area, short-stay car park and a 250-space passenger car park.

The 21st-century modernisation of the Great Western main line programme has seen the installation of new facilities on platforms 2 and 3, including redesigned toilets, waiting rooms and covered areas.

Overhead line equipment has been installed through the city, as part of electrification of the London to Cardiff line, which allows the operation of Japanese-built Intercity Express Programme 10-car trains. The new services are all-electric, with more seats and improvements to journey times between Newport and London of around 1 hour 30 minutes, including non-stop services after Wales between Bristol Parkway and London Paddington.

There are active proposals from Grand Central to operate services from Llanelli, via Cardiff and Newport, to London Paddington, only stopping at Severn Tunnel Junction and Bristol Parkway instead of the current service which also calls at Didcot Parkway, Swindon, Reading.

Services 
The services calling at Newport are:

Great Western Railway
London Paddington – Reading – Bristol Parkway – Newport – Cardiff Central (– Bridgend – Port Talbot – Neath – Swansea)
Cardiff Central – Newport – Bristol Temple Meads – Bath Spa – Salisbury – Southampton – Portsmouth Harbour
Cardiff Central – Newport – Bristol Temple Meads – Weston-super-Mare – Taunton
Transport for Wales
Manchester Piccadilly – Stockport – Crewe – Shrewsbury – Hereford – Cwmbran – Newport – Cardiff Central (– Bridgend – Port Talbot – Neath – Swansea – Carmarthen – Haverfordwest)
Cardiff Central – Newport – Cwmbran – Hereford – Shrewsbury – Wrexham General – Chester – Rhyl – Bangor – Holyhead
Maesteg – Bridgend – Cardiff Central – Newport – Chepstow – Gloucester – Cheltenham Spa
CrossCountry
Cardiff Central – Newport – Gloucester – Cheltenham Spa – Birmingham New Street – Nottingham

Roads

M4 Motorway

The M4 motorway junctions in and near the city area:
23A lies just outside the city boundaries and provides local access via the A4810 and B4245.
24: Coldra A449/A48/B4237
25: Caerleon Road B4596
25A: Grove Park A4042
26: Malpas Road A4051
27: High Cross, B4591
28: Tredegar Park A48/A4072 (A467/A468)
29: St Mellons A48(M) – no access from local roads

The Brynglas Tunnels are a cause of traffic delays as the M4 narrows to two lanes in both directions between junctions 25 and 26.

Southern Distributor Road
 

The Southern Distributor Road (SDR) is part of the A48 road and is a peripheral distributor road, which runs from Junction 24 of the M4 motorway in the east of Newport to Junction 28 in the west. Combined with the M4 in the north, the SDR forms the southern part of a ring road for the city.

Other routes

The major east–west A roads are:

The A48 westbound (Cardiff Road) is as an alternative route from Newport to Cardiff.
The A48 eastbound (Chepstow Road) is as an alternative route from Newport to Chepstow, South West England (via the Severn Bridge), the Wye Valley and Gloucestershire.
The A4072 (Forge Road) from M4 junction 28 connects Newport via the A468 to Machen and Caerphilly.
The A4810 (Queen's Way) connects the SDR at Lee Way to the M4 at junction 23A through the Llanwern Steelworks.

The principal north-south A roads are:
The A449 connects Newport to Usk and the English Midlands via M4 junction 24.
The A4042 connects Newport to Cwmbran, Pontypool and Abergavenny via M4 junction 25A.
The A4051 (Malpas Road) connects Newport to Cwmbran via M4 junction 26.
The A4072 (Forge Road) from M4 junction 28 connects Newport via the A467 to Risca and the towns of the Sirhowy Valley, Ebbw Valley and Rhymney Valley.

The B roads are:
The B4237 (former A48) connects M4 junction 24 to junction 28 (Chepstow Road, Wharf Road, crossing George Street Bridge onto George Street and then Cardiff Road).
The B4596 (Caerleon Road, former A449) links central Newport to Caerleon via M4 Junction 25.
The B4591 (Risca Road/High Cross Road, former A467) is an alternative route from Newport to Risca via M4 Junction 27 (High Cross) and Rogerstone.
The B4245 (Magor Road) at Langstone connects Newport to Underwood, Magor and Caldicot.
The B4239 (Lighthouse Road) at Duffryn connects Newport to Rumney, Cardiff.

City centre

The Old Green Interchange is an elevated roundabout over the A4042 (Heidenheim Drive) at the western end of Newport Bridge. Newport's pedestrianised High Street runs southwest from the interchange through Westgate Square to the pedestrianised Commercial Street. Queensway passes Newport railway station and links the Old Green Interchange to Newport Civic Centre via Clytha Park Road. Kingsway/Usk Way is a boulevard on the west bank of the River Usk linking the Old Green Interchange to the Southern Distributor Road at the western end of City Bridge and to Newport Transporter Bridge.

Corporation Road follows the east bank of the River Usk, but with limited views of the river. It links Newport Bridge to George Street Bridge, Newport City Bridge and, via Stephenson Road, Newport Transporter Bridge.

Notable buildings and structures

See the following categories:
Buildings and structures in Newport, Wales
Landmarks in Newport, Wales
Visitor attractions in Newport, Wales

Many of the landmarks of Newport are in Newport city centre or within a short walking distance of the centre; these include:

Newport Cathedral
Newport Castle
Newport Bridge (1800)
Ye Olde Murenger House (1819)
St Paul's Church (1835)
Newport railway station (1850)
Newport Market (1854)
St Mark's Church (1872)
Rodney Parade (1875)
Westgate Hotel (1881)
Museum Art Gallery and Central Library (1888)
Belle Vue Park (1891)
Royal Gwent Hospital (1901)
Shire Hall (1902)
Transporter Bridge (1906)
Newport Technical Institute (former Art College) (1910)
Civic Centre (1940)
George Street Bridge (1964)
Dolman Theatre (1967)
Newport Centre (1985)
Newport Crown Court (1991)
Newport City Bridge (2004)
Riverfront Arts Centre (2004)
Newport City footbridge (2006)
University of South Wales, Newport Campus (2011)
Newport bus station (2015)

The city has a number of churches of architectural merit.

Other landmarks include:

West Usk Lighthouse – operating as a hotel.
Beechwood House – at Beechwood Park.
Brynglas House – operating as an adult-education centre.
Church of St Mary, Nash – the 12th-century parish church of Nash near Newport described by local historian Fred Hando as "the Cathedral of the Moors".
Lysaght Institute – former working men's club for steelworkers when the Orb Works steel plant moved from Wolverhampton. Built 1928, refurbished 2012.
Isca Augusta – extensive remains of a Roman fortress in the village of Caerleon including a baths, amphitheatre, and barracks. The site of the Cadw Roman Legion museum.
Hanbury Arms, a pub in Caerleon which was noted as the place where Alfred, Lord Tennyson wrote Idylls of the King.
Newport Cenotaph – World War I and World War II memorial in Clarence Place.
Main Post Office – a retained façade of the former main Post Office building in High Street adjacent to the old Corn Exchange. A blue plaque states: "Site of Newport's first Head Post Office. Built in 1844 and rebuilt in 1907, the Edwardian façade being preserved in the total reconstruction of the island site in 2001. Once housed the town's first telephone exchange, known as The Savoy. Listed Grade II in 1985."
The Kings Hotel – former hotel in High Street dated , currently being redeveloped as apartments
Newport Arcade – Victorian arcade linking High Street to Cambrian Road.
Market Arcade – Victorian arcade linking High Street to Market Street.
Waterloo Hotel – Grade II-listed building in Alexandra Road, Pillgwenlly, currently operating as a bistro.
Masonic Hall – Grade II-listed building at 109 Lower Dock Street.
Burton Almshouses – almhouses located on Friars Road, built 1900.
The Old Rising Sun – former public house on Shaftesbury Street, Shaftesbury

Bridges

Newport has nine public bridges spanning the River Usk, connecting the east and west of the city.

From north to south they are: Caerleon Bridge, St. Julian's railway bridge, M4 motorway Usk bridge, Usk Railway Bridge, Newport Bridge, Newport City footbridge, George Street Bridge, City Bridge and Transporter Bridge.

In addition, the Twenty Ten Bridge at the Celtic Manor Resort is a footbridge crossing the River Usk north of Caerleon Bridge, no longer open to the public since May 2019.

The city has had a long history of constructed crossings of the River Usk, beginning in 1800:

1800: First stone structure, Newport Bridge, constructed
1806: Caerleon Bridge built
1850: South Wales Railway Usk Bridge built
1866: Newport Road Bridge widened
1866: St. Julian's railway bridge built
1888: second Usk Railway Bridge built beside first
1906: Transporter Bridge built
1911: Great Western Railway Usk bridge widened
1927: Current Newport Bridge built
1964: George Street Bridge built
1967: M4 motorway Usk bridge built
1989: M4 motorway Usk bridge, and additional crossings, built
2004: City Bridge built
2006: Newport City footbridge built
2010: Twenty Ten Bridge built

Shopping
See also :Category:Shopping in Newport, Wales

City centre
The main shopping streets of Newport city centre are pedestrianised with High Street and Commercial Street forming the north /south axis plus adjoining roads including Newport Arcade, Market Arcade, Skinner Street, Bridge Street, Upper Dock Street, Market Street, Griffin Street, Corn Street, Cambrian Road, Hill Street and Llanarth Street.

The five roads of Commercial Street, Stow Hill, Bridge Street, High Street and Skinner Street converge at Westgate Square (named after the Westgate Hotel) and this is generally regarded as the central point the city.

Kingsway Shopping Centre is an indoor shopping mall. The adjoining £90 million Friars Walk shopping centre opened in November 2015 is regarded as having benefited the city centre; this has 30 shops, about 12 restaurants and an 8-screen cinema. Newport Market is a Victorian indoor market on two floors with outlets for produce and general products.

Retail parks
Outside of the city centre large retail parks are established off the Southern Distributor Road:
Newport Retail Park is to the east at Lliswerry – M4 motorway Junction 24 (Coldra), then A48 (Ringland Way/Spytty Road).
Three retail parks (Harlech, Maesglas and 28 East) around Maesglas to the west of the city – M4 motorway Junction 28 (Tredegar Park), then A48.

Notable people

Education

The University of South Wales campus is on the west bank of the river Usk in Newport city centre. The university can trace its roots to the founding of the Newport Mechanics Institute in 1841. Newport School of Art, Media and Design was one of the first Art Schools to be awarded degree status in 1973 and enjoyed a high reputation in painting, Fine Art, and sculpture throughout the 1960s and 1970s. It is still highly regarded however, especially in documentary photography. The Fine Art course closed in 2013, its final degree show entitled 'depARTure'.

Newport also has the further-education Coleg Gwent City of Newport Campus, informally known as Nash College, in Lliswerry. Brynglas House is currently an Adult Education Centre.

Newport has eight English-medium state comprehensive schools (Bassaleg School, Newport High School, St Joseph's Roman Catholic High School, Caerleon Comprehensive School, John Frost School, Lliswerry High School, Llanwern High School and Saint Julian's School) and one independent comprehensive school (Rougemont School). All schools are governed by Newport Local Education Authority.

Newport has three Welsh-medium primary schools; Ysgol Gymraeg Bro Teyrnon in Brynglas, Ysgol Gymraeg Casnewydd in Ringland and Ysgol Gymraeg Ifor Hael in Bettws. The Welsh-medium secondary school is Ysgol Gyfun Gwent Is Coed in Brynglas. The city's, fourth Welsh-medium primary school is planned to open at the Pillgwenlly Primary site, with the existing school moving to a purpose built building on the former Corus steel Whiteheads site

A Football Academy is based at Llanwern High School. It was established in 1998 as a partnership of Newport County Football Club and Newport City Council. The academy has a development programme of around 50 students undertaking sporting qualifications. The students compete in the South West Counties League as Newport County's youth team.

Culture and arts

See also :Category:Culture in Newport, Wales

Newport Transporter Bridge is one of the few remaining working bridges of its type in the world and featured in the film Tiger Bay. Visitors can travel on the suspended cradle most days and can walk atop the steel framework on bank holidays. The only other British example is Middlesbrough Transporter Bridge. Open days are occasionally held to view the renovation of the historically important Newport Ship.

The Riverfront Arts Centre is a modern purpose-built theatre and arts venue. The Dolman Theatre was refurbished in 2005. The Phyllis Maud Performance Space theatre seats between 25 and 30 in a converted Victorian public toilet.

The city has many works of civic art including:
The  steel Wave by Peter Fink (1991), on the west bank of the River Usk.
Twelve painted murals by Hans Feibusch (1961–64) at the Newport Civic Centre.
Tiled murals by Kenneth Budd (1975) at the Old Green Interchange. 
Union, Prudence, Energy statues commemorating the Chartist Newport Rising outside the Westgate Hotel. Created by Christopher Kelly (1991).
Stand and Stare statue by Paul Bothwell Kincaid, in Commercial Street, commemorating the work of poet W. H. Davies, who was born in Newport and lived his early life there. Davies is best known for his poem Leisure; "What is this life if, full of care, We have no time to stand and stare".
Statue of Charles Morgan, 1st Baron Tredegar, in Bridge Street, created by John Evan Thomas (1850).
Merchant Navy Memorial statue (1991) by Sebastien Boyesen at Gilligan's Island.
This Little Piggy statue by Sebastien Boyesen (1994) outside Newport Market.
The Vision of St.Gwynllyw/The Bell Carrier statue by Sebastien Boyesen (1996) in Llanarth Street.
Archform sculpture by Harvey Hood at Newport Railway Station.
In the Nick of Time, known locally as the Newport Clock, by sculptor Andy Plant at Glan Llyn, Llanwern. Formerly stood in John Frost Square. 
British Women's Temperance Association Drinking Fountain (1913) – terracotta fountain, at Newport Cathedral, made by Royal Doulton.
Stone memorial to the Allied invasion of Europe on 6 June 1944 in High Street.
Chartist Frieze commemorating the Chartist Newport Rising in Friars Walk by Sebastien Boyesen (2015).

Newport has three major museums: Newport Museum in the city centre and at Caerleon the National Roman Legion Museum and Roman Baths Museum. Newport Central Library is located within Newport Museum. In July each year an Arts festival is held in Caerleon and Roman Military re-enactment in the amphitheatre, the largest restored amphitheatre in Britain. The remains of the Roman baths, barracks and fortress walls of Isca Augusta can be seen at Caerleon. Caerleon also has literary associations to the legend of King Arthur through Geoffrey of Monmouth and later Arthur Machen (who was born in Caerleon) and Alfred Lord Tennyson wrote his Idylls of the King in Caerleon.

The Newport Festival runs throughout the summer months with a large number of events being staged in the city centre and elsewhere in the city.

The earliest surviving part of the building dates back to the late 15th century. For over five hundred years, it was home to the Morgans – later Lords Tredegar – until they left in 1951. The house was then bought by the Catholic Church and used as a girls' school until it was bought by the council in 1974, which led to it being described as the "grandest council house in Britain".

Newport hosted the National Eisteddfod of Wales in 1897, 1988 and 2004.

A  mosaic Chartist Mural was created in 1978 near John Frost Square to commemorate the Chartist rising of 1839. It was demolished amid protests in October 2013 to make way for city centre redevelopment. A trust was set up to commission a new memorial with £50,000 of funding provided by Newport City Council In 2014 the Newport Chartist Commission, with members Dame Rosemary Butler, Pat Drewett and Rowan Williams, sought to recruit a project manager.

As part of the city's "Big Splash" festival, on 30 August 2010, 45-year-old French circus star Olivier Roustan from Toulouse, performed the highest ever wirewalk in Europe, along the top cable of the Newport City footbridge.

Newport hosted an outdoor art exhibition called "SuperDragons" in 2010 which displayed 60 large dragons decorated by local community groups.

In November 2013 the Newport Arts, Culture and Heritage Association (NACHA), which promotes "the past, present and future of the arts, culture and heritage of the people of Newport, South Wales" was launched on Facebook. In December 2014 chairman of the Friends of Newport Museum and Art Gallery, Richard Frame, expressed alarm at Newport City Council proposals to close the museum in 2015.

Music and nightlife
See also Music of Newport

The city centre has many pubs, bars and nightclubs, mostly in the vicinity of High Street. The most famous of these was TJ's, an alternative music club where it is claimed that Kurt Cobain of Nirvana proposed to Courtney Love, which closed in 2010. TJ's was voted one of the top 50 'Big Nights Out' in the world by FHM in December 1997.

Newport Centre and the Riverfront Arts Centre are popular concert venues. Other live music venues in the city centre include NEON, Six Feet Under, Le Pub, Riverside Tavern, Warehouse 54, McCann's, Slippin Jimmy's, El Sieco's, and The Potters.

Outdoor music events are held in the summer months at Beechwood Park, Belle Vue Park, Rodney Parade, as well as the Pillgwenlly and Maindee carnivals.

Newport is the subject of a 2010 song "Newport (Ymerodraeth State of Mind)", a parody of the Alicia Keys song "Empire State of Mind." The video went viral, was featured on BBC News, and by August 2010, nearly 2.5 million people had watched it on YouTube. YouTube removed the video due to a copyright claim by music publishers. Newport-based rap group Goldie Lookin Chain released a 'parody of a parody' video in response, alleging that their rivals lacked local knowledge.

City of Newport Male Choir is one of the leading male voice choirs in the region

Parks and playing fields
See also :Category:Parks in Newport, Wales
The main municipal parks in Newport are Tredegar Park, Belle Vue Park and Beechwood Park. The main municipal playing fields are at Tredegar Park, Coronation Park, Glebelands, Pillgwenlly sports ground, Kimberley Park, Shaftesbury Park and Caerleon Broadway.

Walking, cycling and leisure sports

To the south of the city lies the extensive Caldicot and Wentloog Levels and Newport Wetlands Reserve. The Wetlands reserve opened in March 2000 as a mitigation for the loss of mudflats caused by the building of the Cardiff Bay Barrage. A Local Nature Reserve is established at Allt-yr-yn.

Newport City footbridge is a cycle and pedestrian bridge in Newport city centre linking the east and west banks of the River Usk.

A cycle and pedestrian walkway on the west bank of the River Usk links Newport city centre at Crindau to central Caerleon. There is a marked heritage trail in Caerleon. A cycle and pedestrian walkway is on both banks of the River Usk. The East bank path links Newport Bridge to Lliswerry. The West bank path links Newport Bridge to Newport Transporter Bridge and to Lliswerry via Newport City Bridge. It is therefore possible to walk or cycle from the north to the south of the City whilst largely avoiding public roads.

The Celtic Trail cycle route and National Cycle Route 4 passes through Newport.

The main municipal leisure sports facilities are based at Newport Centre in the city centre, Newport International Sports Village at Lliswerry and the Newport Active Living Centre at Bettws. There is a purpose-built indoor bowls arena at the Glebelands.

The city has a thriving Scout District.

Sport
See also :Category:Sport in Newport, Wales

Boxing
The boxer David Pearce was born in Newport.

Rugby
Newport RFC were the only side to beat the Invincible All Blacks of 1963–64.

Since the introduction of regional rugby franchises in Wales in 2003, Newport RFC now play in the Welsh Premier Division and operate as a feeder club to the Dragons regional team, who play in the Pro14 league. Both Newport RFC and the Dragons play at Rodney Parade near Newport city centre.

Nine other rugby union teams playing in the Welsh League are based in Newport; Newport Saracens, Pill Harriers, Newport High School Old Boys, Bettws, Caerleon, Hartridge, Rogerstone, St Julians High School Old Boys and Whiteheads.

Newport's rugby league club are called the Newport Titans and play in the Welsh Conference Premier.

Football

Newport's best known association football club is Newport County, who were formed in 1912 and joined the English Football League in 1920. Newport County have played in the second tier of English football and spent over 60 seasons in the Football League, reached the last 16 of the FA Cup, won the Welsh Cup in 1980 and subsequently reached the quarter-finals of the European Cup Winners' Cup in 1981. They were relegated from the Football League in 1988 and went bankrupt the following year. The club re-formed in 1989. They secured promotion back to the Football League for the 2013–14 season after a 25-year absence and now play in Football League Two.

Newport is home to two teams that play in the Ardal South East league, tier 3 of the Welsh pyramid system: Lliswerry and Newport City. A number of teams play in the Gwent County League tier 4: Caerleon, Newport Civil Service, Newport Corinthians, Pill and Rogerstone. Tier 5: Albion Rovers, Cromwell, Graig and Newport Saints. Tier 6: Riverside Rovers. The city has its own league, the Newport and District Football League, which is part of the Welsh football league system and consequently some Newport clubs field teams in the Gwent County League. Lovell's Athletic were a fairly well known team in the mid-20th century – due to the suspension of League football during the Second World War they were the premier team in the city, as Newport County did not field a side. During this period they managed to reach the 3rd round of the FA Cup in the 1945–46 season.

Dragon Park, the Football Association of Wales' National Football Centre, is located at the Newport International Sports Village. The centre also provides the headquarters for the Welsh Football Trust.

Golf
The city is home to the Celtic Manor Resort, a five-star conference resort and home of the Wales Open, the annual European Tour golf tournament. The resort was the venue for the All*Star Cup celebrity golf tournament in 2005 and for the 2010 Ryder Cup.

The city has high-quality golf facilities at Llanwern Golf Club, Peterstone Golf Club, Parc Golf Academy in Coedkernew and Newport Golf Club and Tredegar Park Golf Club in Rogerstone. Caerleon has a good quality nine-hole municipal course, driving range and clubhouse.

Within a short drive of Newport are golf clubs at St Mellons, Dewstow, Shirenewton, St Pierre, GreenMeadow, Woodlake, Alice Springs, Pontypool and Raglan.

Cycling
The Newport International Sports Village at Lliswerry includes the Wales National Velodrome, the head office of Welsh Cycling.

Tennis
Newport was a key venue for British Tennis. The 'World Group' Ties for the 1906 International Lawn Tennis Challenge (forerunner to the Davis Cup) were hosted at Newport Athletic Club.

Other sports

The Newport International Sports Village has been home to Newport Cricket Club since moving from Rodney Parade in 1990.

For many years the city had a motorcycle speedway team Newport Wasps but the team was disbanded in 2012.

Newport is one of three main cities where British baseball is still played – the others are Cardiff and Liverpool – and the city hosts an international match every four years at Coronation Park.

South East Wales Regional Swimming Pool is located at Newport International Sports Village. Newport Tennis Centre is also located at the complex and is a municipal multi-sport facility for tennis (indoor and outdoor), five-a-side football, basketball, field hockey, netball, table tennis, badminton, and squash.

Newport Squash Club has four courts situated in the grounds of Rodney Parade and the club operates a public pay-per-play arrangement there.

St. Joseph's Amateur Boxing Club is situated on George Street and is the home club of Yemeni-born 2006 Commonwealth bronze medallist Mo Nasir and 2010 Commonwealth Silver medallist Sean McGoldrick.

Treetops Shooting Ground, Coedkernew is one of Britain's best-equipped clay pigeon shooting grounds and often hosts competitions between local shooting clubs and university clay shooting clubs from around South Wales and South West England.

Newport hosted the International Cross Country Championships (1903–1972) on six occasions (1906, 1911, 1921, 1927, 1933 and 1955) at Caerleon Racecourse.

Newport has a Skittle Alley League consisting of over 50 teams who play their league games on a Friday evening.

Horse racing was held at Newport Racecourse, Caerleon, from the 1840s until it closed in 1948. In its final year of racing the course staged the Welsh Grand National for the only time.

Annual sporting events
The city is currently home to a number of annual sporting events, including:
The Wales Open European Tour golf tournament
The Elemis Invitational Trophy tennis tournament
The Welsh Open world ranking snooker tournament
The World Cup of Pool
The Newport Half Marathon

Local media
Newport's local newspaper is the South Wales Argus, which is published in the city and distributed throughout the city and surrounding area.

There's also a daily Newport edition of the Western Mail that serves the city, along with its digital publication NewportOnline – the city's most-read online news platform.

Local analogue radio broadcasting licences cover the Cardiff/Newport area; the FM licence is held by Cardiff Broadcasting Co. Ltd., broadcasting as Capital FM South Wales from Cardiff Bay and the AM licence is held by Capital Radio plc, broadcasting as Capital Gold. The local DAB ensembles are Cardiff and Newport (11C) and South Wales and Severn Estuary (12C).

Newport has several internet radio stations, the most popular of which is Newport City Radio.

Twinning
 Heidenheim, Germany (since 1980)
 Kutaisi, Georgia (since 1989)

Former relations 
 Guangxi Province, China, from 1996 to 2019 (defunct)

Newport City Council voted unanimously on 23 July 2019 to effectively end relations with the Guangxi Province region of China.

38,000 people had petitioned the council to end its twinning agreement due to the Yulin Dog Meat Festival, which takes place in the Guangxi town of Yulin each year. Council Leader Debbie Wilcox, Baroness Wilcox stated that while the council had previously written a strong letter to officials from Guangxi, this had been ignored, and that cutting ties was now necessary. The Council says it will now lobby the Foreign and Commonwealth Office and the Great Britain–China Centre on the issue of protecting dogs.

Freedom of the City
The following people, military units and Groups have received the Freedom of the City of Newport.

Individuals
Rt Hon Lord Tredegar: 1909. (Borough of Newport)
Alderman John Moses : 1909. (Borough of Newport)
Albert Augustus Newman: 1922. (Borough of Newport)
Rt Hon James Henry Thomas : 1924. (Borough of Newport)
Alderman John Parry : 1927. (Borough of Newport)
Horace Sampson Lyne : 1934. (Borough of Newport)
Alderman John Moxon : 1935. (Borough of Newport)
William Royse Lysaght : 1936. (Borough of Newport)
Alderman Frederick Phillips : 1936. (Borough of Newport)
Alderman John Lloyd Davies : 1936. (Borough of Newport)
Field Marshal Rt Hon Lord Montgomery of Alamein : 1945. (Borough of Newport)
Mrs. Mary Ann Hart : 1954. (Borough of Newport)
Alderman Aubrey Hames: 19 February 1998. (Borough of Newport)
Sir Harry Jones : 8 April 2004. (City of Newport)

Military units
The South Wales Borderers: 1947. (Borough of Newport)
The Royal Regiment of Wales: 1969. (Borough of Newport)
104th Regiment Royal Artillery (Volunteers): 1978. (Borough of Newport)
The Royal Welch Fusiliers: 2001. (Borough of Newport)
The Merchant Navy Association (Red Duster): 2002. (City of Newport)
HMS Severn, RN: 2006. (City of Newport)

Organisations and groups
Newport County Association Football Club: 2013. (City of Newport)
Newport Rugby Football Club: 2013. (City of Newport)
The Royal British Legion: 29 June 2021. (City of Newport)

See also

Newport Castle
Newport power station

References

External links

Newport City Council
City Centre information
Port of Newport
Newport's War Dead
'Newport First Stop' – 100 Years of News Stories at newportpast.com

 
Cities in Wales
Populated coastal places in Wales
Principal areas of Wales
River Usk
Port cities and towns in Wales